Makarajhola is a village and a Gram panchayat in Ganjam district in the Indian state of Odisha.

Geography
Makarajhola  (ମକରଝୋଳ) is located at the town hinjilicut at 5 km on south and 2 km of NH59 on east side.  It is situated at 18 km from Silk City, Brahmapur on East  # NH-59

Demographics
 India, Makarajhola had a population of 5,436 . Males constitute 51% of the population and females 49%.

The Makarajhola Gram panchayat would consists of the area such as Makarajhola, Palli padmanabhapur, Balarampur, Sompur, Pochilima,
Singipur, venkataraya palli and Buguda palli Before 20 Years ago .Now Makarajhola Gram panchayat divides two panchayats .one is Makarajhola Gram panchayat  would consists of the area such as Makarajhola, Palli padmanabhapur, Balarampur and another is Pochilima Gram panchayat would consists of the area such as Pochilima, Singipur, venkataraya palli, Buguda palli and Sompur.

History
According to festival of Makar Sankranti & Kothisala Yatra and Thakurani Yatra

Transport and communication
 This village lies on NH-59 (Gopalpur-on-Sea to Ahmedabad) . The three-wheeler auto taxis are the most important mode of transportation in this village. Well connected by road & rail, it is an important hub for most trains at, Brahmapur, Odisha. The nearest airport is Biju Patnaik Airport, Bhubaneswar which is 174  km away. It also has the largest weekly market on every Saturday.
In Hinjilicut Block Makarajhola Gram panchayat  is  famous from other gram panchayats.
 Bus Service: To almost all places throughout Odisha it is well connected.
 Cellular Service / Mobile Service Providers in Makarajhola : Airtel, BSNL, Idea, and Tata-docomo Mobile.

Location
Makarajhola is situated at 18  km from Silk City, Brahmapur, Odisha on East and 2 km from  NH-59 on the West. The famous and ancient Maa Dandakali Temple of Adi shakti.

Banks
 Makarajhola co-operative society ltd.

Post office, insurance, trading
 Main Post Office, Kanchuru
 Sub Post Office, Makarajhola

Industries
 rice mills
 Co-operative Society of Handlooms

Education
students are separated after completion of metric many lines such as diploma engineering, intermediate etc.wel education in Makarajhola
in this village 60% of peoples are farmer and 40% of people are teachers, engineers etc. Now village have 85% educated population.

Colleges
No colleges in this village, for college study students are going to hinjilicut, pochilima, kukudakhandi and berhampur
 Science College, Hinjilicut.(NAAC Rating B+)
 KhambeyaDora Science College, Pochilima, Hinjilicut

High schools
 Makarajhola High School, Makarajhola at  siksha niketan
 RSS UP School, Makarajhola

Healthcare
 Sub divisional healthcare, Makarajhola
 Government CHC Hospital, Hinjilicut
 Shankar Netralaya - Eye Hospital (A 200-bed eye hospital), Near Saru Chhaka, Hinjilicut
 Government Veterinary Hospital, Hinjilicut

Politics
Hinjili is part of Aska (Lok Sabha constituency).

Festivals
 Thakurani Yatra -Every seven year difference this yatra held with welfare funds of Mumbai, Delhi & Village Funds.
 Makarajhola thakurani Yatra -Every Year on the month of October–November for one month: A special police outpost for Thakurani Jatra was opened up at Makarajhol village.
Odisha has several festivals. All those festivals are celebrated in a grand way at Makarajhola. But the Unique festivals of Makarajhola are Dusshere & thakurani Yatra. Dusshera is the festival of goddess Durga.  
 Makarajhola – Jagannath Temple Ratha Yatra
 Makarajhola- Last day of Danda nachha on Meru day.
 Makarajhola- Maha Shiva Ratri Utsav
The village is along with activities to welcome goddess Budhi Thakurani to her temporary abode for the biennial Thakurani Jatra festival at late night . The hereditary head of the festival, who is also regarded as the head of the weaver Ellema community of the village, Desibehera dressed in his traditional attire reached the Budhi Thakurani temple to invite the goddess to her parental abode at his home .

References

External links
 http://www.gloriousindia.com/unleashed/place.php?id=4546

Villages in Ganjam district